General Napier Christie Burton (born Napier Christie, 31 August 1758 – 2 January 1835) was a senior British Army officer and Member of Parliament.

He was born in America, the only surviving son of General Gabriel Christie of Stirling, Scotland and Montreal, Canada and his wife Sarah, the daughter of John Stevenson of Albany, New York. He took the additional surname of Burton by royal licence on the death of his brother-in-law, Captain Richard Burton, in 1784 and inherited his father's estate in 1799.

He became an officer in the British Army, joining in 1775 as an ensign in the 22nd Foot. He transferred to the 3rd Foot Guards in 1776 and fought in the American War of Independence as a lieutenant. He was present at the Battle of Springfield (1780) before going to South Carolina, where he took part in the battles of Guilford and Cross Creek before being taken prisoner at the Siege of Yorktown in 1781.

After his return from America he served with the 1st Dragoon Guards in Flanders and was promoted captain and lt.-colonel in 1789, brevet colonel in 1795 and brigadier-general in 1796, when he served on the staff in Guernsey. Promoted again to major-general he served on the staff in eastern England before being posted to act as Lieutenant Governor of Upper Canada from 1799 to 1802. He returned to England following the death of his wife and served time in Chester as a major in the 3rd Foot Guards before being posted to Ireland in 1806 as colonel-commandant of the first the 6th Battalion and then the 1st Battalion of the 60th (Royal American) Regiment of Foot (until his death).

In 1796 he was returned to Parliament as the member for Beverley. At the following general election of 1806 he fought a duel with the winning candidate, John Wharton, a fellow officer, which ended his political career.

A man who lived beyond his means he was forced to sell most of his own and his wife's inheritance to pay his debts but nevertheless spent time in prison in 1812 for owing money. In spite of this he was made a full general in 1814.

He died in 1835. He had married Mary, the daughter and eventual heiress of Major-General Ralph Burton of Hull Bank, Beverley, with whom he had 2 sons and 2 daughters. Of their sons, both of whom died unmarried, Robert Christie Burton became MP for Beverley in 1818. Their eldest daughter married firstly Major-General John Clitherow and secondly Henry Peters of Betchworth Castle. Their youngest daughter founded at Wakefield a home for discharged female prisoners.

References

|-

|-

|-

1758 births
1835 deaths
British Army generals
Members of the Parliament of Great Britain for English constituencies
British MPs 1796–1800
Members of the Parliament of the United Kingdom for English constituencies
UK MPs 1801–1802
UK MPs 1802–1806